Lauren Margot Peachy Child  (born Helen Child; 29 November 1965) is an English children's author and illustrator. She is best known for the Charlie and Lola picture book series and other book series. Her influences include E. H. Shepard, Quentin Blake, Carl Larsson, and Ludwig Bemelmans.

Child introduced Charlie and Lola in 2000 with I Will Not Ever Never Eat A Tomato and won the annual Kate Greenaway Medal from the Library Association for the year's most "distinguished illustration in a book for children". For the 50th anniversary of the Medal (1955–2005), a panel named it one of the top ten winning works, which comprised the shortlist for a public vote for the nation's favourite. It finished third in the public vote from that shortlist.

Life

Lauren Child was born in Berkshire in 1965 and was raised in Marlborough, Wiltshire, where her father led the art department at Marlborough College and her mother taught in a primary school. She was the middle child of three daughters. She changed her first name from Helen to Lauren when she was a child. She attended St John's School and, from 16, Marlborough College. She studied Art briefly at Manchester Polytechnic and later at City and Guilds of London Art School. She started her own company, Chandeliers for the People, making lampshades. Between 1998 and 2003 she worked for the design agency Big Fish and includes its founder Perry Haydn Taylor in the dedications of her books.

Two picture books both written and illustrated by Child were published in 1999, and also issued in the U.S. within the year: I Want a Pet! and Clarice Bean, That's Me. The latter, published by Orchard Books, inaugurated the Clarice Bean series, was a highly commended runner-up for the Greenaway Medal, and made the Nestlé Smarties Book Prize shortlist. Next year she won the Greenaway Medal for the first Charlie and Lola book, I Will Not Ever, NEVER Eat a Tomato. Her timing was good, for a bequest by Colin Mears had provided a £5,000 cash prize to supplement the medal beginning that year.
She won a second Smarties Prize in 2002 for That Pesky Rat, which was commended for the Greenaway too. In the same year she wrote her first children's novel, Utterly Me, Clarice Bean, one of 39 books nominated by the librarians for the Carnegie Medal. Her second novel in this series, Clarice Bean Spells Trouble was shortlisted for the 2005 British Book Awards Children's Book of the Year. The third novel, Clarice Bean, Don't Look Now was published in 2007.

Child's illustrations contain different media including magazine cuttings, collage, material and photography as well as traditional watercolours. She is the illustrator of the Definitely Daisy series by Jenny Oldfield.

A television series based on her Charlie and Lola books was made by Tiger Aspect for CBeebies, on which Child was an Associate Producer.  Three series of 26 episodes and two specials were made.  Charlie and Lola has been sold throughout the world, and won BAFTAs in 2007 for Best children's Television Show and Best Script.

She was announced as the new Children's Laureate for the UK on 7 June 2017 at a ceremony at Hull City Hall.

Charlie and Lola

Charlie and Lola is a series of picture books made by Lauren Child and was later adapted into a children's TV show. Each half-hour format show contains two segments with different plots, each starting off with Charlie saying, "I have this little sister, Lola.  She is small and very funny." Charlie was based on her boyfriend, Soren, who used to wear shirts just like Charlie's, but with his name on it. Lola was based on a pixie-looking girl Child saw on a train who was with her parents, a young couple, and kept bombarding them with questions. Soren Lorenson was based on Lauren's boyfriend's sister's "better" imaginary brother, and so Soren Lorenson became Lola's imaginary friend.

Clarice Bean

Clarice Bean is a picture book and novel series by Lauren Child aimed at children and young teenagers. Her full name is Clarice Bean Tuesday. She is best friends with Betty P Moody, and Karl Wrenbury is another friend of hers. She is enemies with Grace Grapello and Mrs Wilberton (her teacher). She is a not a very good speller and she day-dreams a lot. Her family consists of her mum, dad, younger brother Minal Cricket, older sister Marcie, her even older brother Kurt, her grandad and her granny who lives in America and who phones regularly. Clarice Bean is a fan of a book series called Ruby Redfort. Initially fictional, the Ruby Redfort series was later written by Child, with the first book published in 2011. 
The books in the Clarice Bean series are:
Clarice Bean, That's Me - picture book -  about Clarice's big family.
My Uncle is a Hunkle, Says Clarice Bean - picture book - Clarice's parents have gone away and she is looked after by her Uncle.
What Planet Are You From Clarice Bean? - picture book - Clarice and her brother Kurt try to save Earth.
Utterly Me, Clarice Bean - novel - Clarice has to do a dreary book project but there's a prize she wants to win.
Clarice Bean Spells Trouble - novel - Clarice is in big trouble and it's all because of spelling.
Clarice Bean, Don't Look Now! - novel -  Clarice has a worry list and is wondering what her worst worry is.

Ruby Redfort

In 2009, Child signed a new six-book deal with HarperCollins for the release of her Ruby Redfort series. Ruby Redfort, undercover agent and mystery solver, is familiar to Lauren's readers as Clarice Bean's favourite literary character.

Ruby is a genius code-cracker, a daring detective, and a gadget-laden special agent who just happens to be a thirteen-year-old girl. She and her slick side-kick butler, Hitch, foil crimes and get into loads of scrapes with evil villains, but they're always ice-cool in a crisis.

The first book in the series, Ruby Redfort: Look into My Eyes was released in September 2011 in hard back, with the paperback version released in July 2012.

The secret codes used in the book were developed by Child and mathematician Marcus du Sautoy. The main codes in all five books are based around senses. The first book: sight, the second book: hearing, the third book: smell, the fourth being touch and the fifth being taste.

A second Ruby book, Ruby Redfort, Take Your Last Breath was followed by a third, Catch Your Death. A fourth Ruby novel, Feel the Fear was released on 18 November 2014. A fifth book was released on 9 November 2015 titled Pick Your Poison. The sixth and final book, Blink and You Die, was released in October 2016.

The first handbook in the Ruby Redfort series is Hang in There Bozo: The Ruby Redfort Emergency Survival Guide for Some Tricky Predicaments.

Works

As writer and illustrator

 Clarice Bean, That's Me (1999) —first in the Clarice Bean series
 I Want a Pet! (1999)
 Beware of the Storybook Wolves (2000)
 I Will Not Ever Never Eat a Tomato (2000) —first in the Charlie and Lola series
 My Uncle is a Hunkle Says Clarice Bean (2000) —Clarice Bean
 I Am Not Sleepy and I Will Not Go to Bed (2001) —Charlie and Lola
 My Dream Bed (2001), with paper engineering by Andrew Baron
 What Planet Are You From Clarice Bean? (2001) —Clarice Bean 
 That Pesky Rat (2002)
 Utterly me, Clarice Bean (2002) —Clarice Bean, the first novel 
 Who's Afraid of the Big Bad Book? (2002)
 I Am Too Absolutely Small for School (2003) —Charlie and Lola
 Clarice Bean Spells Trouble (2004) —Clarice Bean novel
 Hubert Horatio Bartle Bobton-Trent (2004)
 Bat Cat (2005)
 Beware of Storybook Wolves (2005)
 The Princess and the Pea (2005), adapted from the 1835 fairy tale by Hans Christian Andersen, with photographs by Polly Borland
 Clarice Bean, Don't Look Now (2006) —Clarice Bean novel
 Who Wants to be a Poodle, I Don't (2009)
 Slightly Invisible (2010) —Charlie and Lola
 The New Small Person (2015)
 How To Raise Your Grown-Ups —Hubert Horatio, Book 1 (2018)

As writer 

 Ruby Redfort, Look into My Eyes (2011)
 Ruby Redfort, Take Your Last Breath (2012)
 Maude: The Not-so-noticeable Shrimpton (2012)
 Ruby Redfort, Hang in There Bozo (2013)
 Ruby Redfort, Catch Your Death (2013)
 Ruby Redfort, Feel The Fear (2014)
 Ruby Redfort, Pick Your Poison (2015)
 Ruby Redfort, Blink And You Die (2016)

As illustrator

 Addy the Baddy (1993)
 Stand Up for Yourself! (1996)
 The Complete Poetical Works of Phoebe Flood (1997)
 Dream On, Daisy! (2001)
 I'd Like a Little Word, Leonie (2001)
 Just You Wait, Winona (2001)
 What's the Matter, Maya? (2001)
 You Must Be Joking, Jimmy! (2001)
 You're a Disgrace, Daisy (2001)
 Dan's Angel: A Detective's Guide to the Language of Painting (2002)
 Pippi Longstocking (2007), an edition of the 1945 classic by Astrid Lindgren
 Anne of Green Gables series (2008, 2009), Puffin centennial reissue of the classic by Lucy Maud Montgomery
 Anne of Green Gables, orig. 1908
 Anne of Avonlea, orig. 1909
 Anne of the Island, orig. 1915
Child was the cover artist for all three volumes and the author of at least the first volume's introduction.

Awards and honours

Child was appointed Member of the Order of the British Empire (MBE) in the 2010 New Year Honours and Commander of the Order of the British Empire (CBE) in the 2021 Birthday Honours for services to children's literature.

Awards as a writer:

 1999, Clarice Bean, That's Me, Nestlé Smarties Book Prize, Bronze award: 6–8 years category
 2000, Beware of the Storybook Wolves, Nestlé Smarties Book Prize, Bronze award: 6–8 years category
 2001, What Planet Are You From, Clarice Bean?, Nestlé Smarties Book Prize, Kids' Club Network Special Award
 2001, What Planet Are You From, Clarice Bean?, Nestlé Smarties Book Prize, Bronze award: 6–8 years category
 2002, That Pesky Rat, Nestlé Smarties Book Prize, Kids' Club Network Special Award
 2002, That Pesky Rat, Nestlé Smarties Book Prize, Gold award: 6–8 years category
 2005, Clarice Bean Spells Trouble made the British Children's Book of the Year shortlist
 2005, Clarice Bean Spells Trouble made the Red House Children's Book Award shortlist
 2016, The New Small Person, Charlotte Zolotow Award Honor book
2017, Absolutely One Thing, Mathical Book Prize
Ruby Redfort: Feel the Fear, Mathical Honors

Awards as an illustrator:

 1999, Clarice Bean, That's Me, Kate Greenaway Medal Highly Commended
 2000, I Will Not Ever Never Eat A Tomato, Kate Greenaway Medal Winner
 2000, Beware of the Storybook Wolves, Kate Greenaway Medal shortlisted
 2002, That Pesky Rat, Kate Greenaway Medal Commended
 2002, Who's Afraid of the Big Bad Book?, Kate Greenaway Medal shortlisted

See also

Notes

References

External links
  (slow)
 Lauren Child Interview (2001) at Jubilee Books (archived 2012-03-30)
 
  

British children's book illustrators
English children's writers
English illustrators
Commanders of the Order of the British Empire
Kate Greenaway Medal winners
Writers who illustrated their own writing
People from Marlborough, Wiltshire
People educated at Marlborough College
People educated at St John's Marlborough
1965 births
Living people
British women illustrators
Alumni of the City and Guilds of London Art School